Lori McNeil and Rennae Stubbs were the defending champions, but lost in the semifinals to Arantxa Sánchez Vicario and Helena Suková.

Larisa Neiland and Jana Novotná won the title by defeating Sánchez Vicario and Suková 6–1, 6–2 in the final.

Seeds
The first four seeds received a bye into the second round.

Draw

Finals

Top half

Bottom half

References

External links
 Official results archive (ITF)
 Official results archive (WTA)

1993 WTA Tour